James Gary Pretlow (born August 27, 1949) is a member of the New York State Assembly representing the 89th Assembly District. First elected in 1992, Pretlow is a Democrat. Before being elected to the Assembly, he served on the Mount Vernon City Council. Pretlow chairs the Assembly Committee on Racing and Wagering.

On January 17th, 2023 Pretlow introduced Assembly Bill 1380 which would legalize some forms of online poker in New York by classifying them as skill-based games.

References

External links
New York State Assembly Member Website

		

Living people
Democratic Party members of the New York State Assembly
1949 births
Politicians from Mount Vernon, New York
New York (state) city council members
21st-century American politicians
American people of Bahamian descent